Allenheads is a former mining village in the Pennines to the north of Weardale in Northumberland, England. Lead extraction was the settlement's industry until the mine closed in the late 19th century.

History

The settlement was founded around lead mining. The first mine to open in the area was in the 1880s. It soon became a leading lead mines in the Northern Dales. However, within two decades of opening, it was closed in 1896 devastating the local community.

In 1970s, the mine was briefly reopened by British Steel Corporation as the Beaumont Mine in the 1970s to extract Fluorspar. However, the venture was not a success as it proved cheaper to source the Fluorite elsewhere.

The local economy is now dependent on agriculture and tourism. The village currently has a café, a contemporary Arts centre, and inn. An industrial heritage centre chronicling the local mining industry has a preserved Armstrong Whitworth hydraulic engine which was located in the mine's sawmill. It is now located in a purpose made exhibition hall in the village centre. Several hydraulic engines – built by the engineering firm started by William Armstrong, 1st Baron Armstrong of Elswick, Tyne and Wear-  were installed at the mine. Drawings of these other machines have been conserved.

In October 2017 the North Pennines Observatory was opened at the village's Old School House.

The Highforest Show is held on the first Saturday of September each year. The show is a community event, organised by a local committee, and allows the village to showcase its various talents. Each year there is usually a quoits competition, dog show and children's attractions and stalls.

Governance
Allenheads is in the parliamentary constituency of Hexham; Guy Opperman of the Conservative Party is the Member of Parliament.

Prior to Brexit, for the European Parliament its residents voted to elect MEPs for the North East England constituency.

For Local Government purposes it belongs to Northumberland County Council, a unitary authority.

References

External links 
 Up-to-date weather news, including temperature, wind speed, air pressure, and information about past weather
 Thomas Sopwith wrote a great deal about Allenheads and his key text is available online.

Villages in Northumberland